Lake City Township is a township in Barber County, Kansas, USA.  As of the 2000 census, its population was 83.

Geography

The streams of Cottonwood Creek, Dog Creek, Little Bear Creek, Little Driftwood Creek, Little Mule Creek, Oak Creek, Puckett Creek, Sand Creek and Sand Creek run through this township.

Transportation
Lake City Township contains one airport or landing strip, Mills Landing Strip.

References
 USGS Geographic Names Information System (GNIS)

External links
"Lake City, Barber County, Kansas" Barber County, Kansas: History and Genealogy.
"Reuben Lake " Founder of Lake City, Kansas.
"Lake City Cemetery " Lake City, Kansas.
"Oak Creek Ranch" History, geology and maps of a ranch near Lake City, Kansas.
 City-Data.com

Townships in Barber County, Kansas
Townships in Kansas